Unter einer Decke is a German television series, based on the British television series The Two of Us.

See also
List of German television series

External links
 

1993 German television series debuts
1994 German television series endings
German comedy television series
German-language television shows
RTL (German TV channel) original programming